The 2014–15 season was Futbol Club Barcelona's 115th in existence and the club's 84th consecutive season in the top flight of Spanish football. This was the first of the three seasons under head coach Luis Enrique.

The season was one of the most successful ones in the club's history, as Barcelona clinched its second continental treble after winning La Liga, the Copa del Rey and the UEFA Champions League. The league title was won in a closely fought title race with Real Madrid, while the Copa victory was achieved with a brilliant 3–1 victory over Athletic Bilbao at Camp Nou in the final. In the Champions League, Barcelona overcame Bayern Munich (3–0 home, 2–3 away) to set up the final against Juventus in Berlin, where Barça triumphed 3–1. Barcelona's success may be in large part attributed to their formidable attacking trio composed of Lionel Messi, Neymar and summer signing Luis Suárez, who scored a record 122 goals in all competitions to become the trio with most goals in a single season in Spanish football history.

The season was the first since 1998–99 without former captain Carles Puyol, who retired after the 2013–14 season and 2001-02 without goalkeeper Víctor Valdés, who left to Manchester United in January 2015.

Season overview

May
At the end of the 2013–14 FC Barcelona season, goalkeepers José Manuel Pinto and Víctor Valdés expired contracts were not renewed. Barcelona quickly signed Marc-André ter Stegen from Bundesliga club Borussia Mönchengladbach, and Claudio Bravo from fellow La Liga outfit Real Sociedad. On 15 May, long-time captain Carles Puyol announced his retirement from football after a 15-year career on the first team. Puyol was subsequently named Assistant to Sports Management under Director of football Andoni Zubizarreta. On 19 May, Luis Enrique was named the new manager after it was announced that Gerardo Martino would step down at the end of the season. Luis Enrique returned to Barça after being the B Team manager from 2008 to 2011.

June
On 12 June, Barcelona and Premier League club Chelsea reached an agreement for the transfer of midfielder Cesc Fàbregas for a reported fee of €33 million. With the move, Fàbregas returns to London where he started his first team career as an Arsenal player. On 16 June, Barcelona signed Croatian midfielder Ivan Rakitić from Sevilla for €18 million along with the loan of Barcelona B midfielder Denis Suárez for the next two seasons. Rakitić joins after leading Sevilla to the 2013–14 UEFA Europa League title, where he was named man of the match in the final.

July
On 9 July, Barcelona announced the transfer of Jonathan dos Santos to Villarreal for a fee of €2 million. Most of his last season with the club was spent recovering from an ACL tear which he suffered in training on 23 October 2013. With the move, Jonathan reunites with his older brother Giovani dos Santos, since both players shared time on the Barcelona youth team. On 10 July, Barcelona announced it had rescinded the contract of forward Isaac Cuenca. Cuenca then made the move to Deportivo de La Coruña, where he signed for one season to join the Galician club. Later in the day, Barcelona completed the transfer of Alexis Sánchez to Arsenal for €42 million. Sánchez left after three years when he had played 141 matches and scored 47 goals, including a season personal best of 21 goals during the 2013–14 season.

On 11 July, Barcelona and English club Liverpool announced the transfer of Uruguayan international forward Luis Suárez for a reported fee of £75 million. The reigning European Golden Shoe winner joins after spending four seasons with the Merseyside club in which he scored 82 goals in 133 appearances. Barcelona will be without Suárez's services after the FIFA Disciplinary Committee banned the player for four months of any football-related activity after he was found guilty of biting Italian defender Giorgio Chiellini during Uruguay's final World Cup group stage match. The suspension means Suárez is unable to play for Barcelona until 26 October. Later in the day, goalkeeper Oier moved to Granada on a free transfer to the Andalusian club. The transfer, however, includes the caveat that "Barcelona reserves the economic rights to any future transfer of the player".

On 16 July, Barcelona announced that Spanish winger Cristian Tello would be moving on a two-year loan deal to Portuguese club Porto for a loan fee of €2 million. The deal includes a purchase option for Porto of €8 million. Barcelona also informed that left back Adriano would be out four-to-six weeks with an abnormal heart rhythm discovered during his return medical. On 19 July, Barcelona played their first friendly of the pre-season against Recreativo de Huelva at the Nuevo Colombino in Huelva. The match ended 0–1 with the only goal coming from Barcelona B winger Joan Àngel Román in the 66th minute that gave Barça the Trofeo Colombino for the first time.

On 22 July, Barcelona parted ways with La Masia graduate and youth system all-time leading scorer Bojan. Bojan moved to English club Stoke City where he joins fellow La Masia graduate Marc Muniesa and ex-Barça striker and current manager Mark Hughes. On 23 July, Barcelona announced the transfer of French international central defender Jérémy Mathieu from Valencia for a transfer fee of €20 million. Mathieu signed a contract for four seasons, with an optional season, and a buyout fee of €50 million. With the move, Mathieu becomes the most expensive defender over 30 years old to be transferred.

August
On 9 August, Barcelona announced the signing of Belgium international defender Thomas Vermaelen from Arsenal for a fee of €19 million. The next day, Barcelona also announced that Ibrahim Afellay would be headed to Olympiacos in the Superleague Greece for a season-long loan. On 14 August, the Court of Arbitration for Sport (CAS) confirmed the ban imposed by FIFA against Suárez, who remains suspended from football for four months, as well as a nine international match ban. However, the CAS removed the player's "football-related activities" ban, and was allowed to train with Barcelona. Barcelona also announced it had reached an agreement with Sevilla for the loan of forward Gerard Deulofeu for the 2014–15 season.

On 19 August, the FIFA Appeal Committee upheld its transfer ban on Barcelona in regards to "breaches relating to the international transfer and registration of players under the age of 18." Barcelona will be unable to transfer players during both the 2015 winter and summer transfer windows. Barcelona released a statement stating "that it shall continue defending its interests before the highest sporting authority, in this case the CAS". On 24 August, Barcelona started the season campaign with a 3-0 victory over Elche at the Camp Nou. A brace by Lionel Messi and a third by youth player Munir sealed the win for the Blaugrana. On 27 August, Barcelona announced it had reached an agreement with Brazilian club São Paulo for the transfer of right-back Douglas.

On 30 August, Barcelona and West Ham United announced the loan for Cameroonian international Alex Song for the remainder of the season to the Premier League club. The next day, Barcelona won their first away match at El Madrigal 0–1 versus Villarreal with the lone goal scored by Barça B forward Sandro.

September

On 13 September, Barcelona played their first match after the FIFA international break and for the first time in their history, wore their Senyera shirts from the previous season in a home game. The Senyera was used to commemorate the 300th anniversary of the Siege of Barcelona in 1714. The match finished 2–0 victory against Athletic Bilbao with two second half goals from Neymar. On 17 September, Barcelona played their first match in the 2014–15 UEFA Champions League edition against Cypriot champions APOEL. It was the official debut of youngster Sergi Samper for the first team and the 300th match for Dani Alves at Barcelona. Barça won the match 1–0 with Lionel Messi heading the winning goal in 28th minute. Piqué was named Man of the Match.

On 21 September, Barcelona played against Levante. Goals from Neymar, Ivan Rakitić, Sandro, Pedro and Messi ensured that Barcelona had maintained their perfect record. On 24 September, Barcelona took on Málaga at La Rosaleda. It was the debut match for Douglas. Barcelona dropped first point of the season in La Liga as the game ended as a goalless draw. On 27 September, Barcelona played against Granada at Camp Nou. Barcelona kept up home form with a big win thanks to Neymar's first hat-trick of the season and a brace from Messi; the other goal came from Rakitić. On 30 September, Barcelona played its second match in the Champions League, against Paris Saint-Germain at the Parc des Princes. It was the first defeat of the season and also the first time in the season Barça conceded a goal; PSG won 3–2, were goals from Messi and Neymar were not enough to escape defeat.

October
On 4 October, Barcelona played Rayo Vallecano at the Campo de Vallecas. In an eventual 0–2 win with goals from Messi and Neymar, goalkeeper Claudio Bravo made La Liga history by going 630 minutes without conceding a goal, surpassing former Barça goalkeeper Pedro María Artola's record of 560 minutes, set in 1978. After an international break, Barcelona faced Eibar at Camp Nou on 18 October. Barça won the match 3–0, with late goals from Messi, Neymar and Xavi. On 21 October, Barcelona hosted Ajax at Camp Nou. Goals from Messi and Neymar and a late goal from youngster Sandro gave Barcelona a comfortable 3–1 win. On 25 October, Barcelona played the first Clásico of the season at the Santiago Bernabéu. This was the official debut match of star forward Luis Suárez due to his ban for biting Italy defender Giorgio Chellini during the 2014 FIFA World Cup. Neymar gave Barcelona an early lead but Barcelona could not further capitalize on the lead; a converted penalty from Cristiano Ronaldo and goals from Pepe and Karim Benzema resulted in a 3–1 defeat. This was the first defeat for Barcelona in their 2014–15 Liga campaign. Claudio Bravo's clean sheet run ended at 754 minutes..

November
On 1 November, Barcelona played against Celta de Vigo. Barcelona's losing streak continued as they experienced their first home defeat of the season at Camp Nou; a single goal from Joaquín Larrivey decided the outcome of the match. Barça were down to the fourth position in the league table with the loss. On 5 November, Barca played against Ajax at Amsterdam Arena; Messi scored a brace as Barcelona won the match 0–2. With these two goals, Messi equalized the Raúl's record as the all-time top scorer in the UEFA Champions League.

On 8 November, Barcelona visited Juegos Mediterráneos to play against Almería. Barcelona earned a hard-fought win thanks to late goals from Neymar and Jordi Alba as Thievy Bifouma gave Almería the lead after 37 minutes. This win brought Barcelona to second in the table. After the last international break of the year, Barça took on Sevilla at Camp Nou, winning 5–1 off goals by Neymar and Rakitić and a hat-trick from Messi, with Alba scoring an own goal. With his second goal, Messi broke the record of Telmo Zarra to become the all-time top scorer of La Liga.

On 25 November, Barça won 0–4 against APOEL at GSP Stadium of Nicosia, Cyprus. Messi scored a hat-trick and Luis Suárez scored his first official goal for Barcelona. The hat-trick made Messi the all-time top scorer of the Champions League, surpassing Raúl. On 30 November, Barcelona earned a dramatic win against Valencia at Mestalla after an injury time goal from Sergio Busquets gave Barça the 0–1 win. At the time of celebrating the goal, Messi was struck by a bottle by a Valencia fan. When Messi tried to report the incident to referee, he was shown a yellow card due to misunderstanding. Later on, due to the appeal from the club, the card was rescinded.

December
On 2 December, Barcelona defender Thomas Vermaelen, who was yet to make his official debut with Barcelona, underwent successful knee surgery in Finland. He would be out for next five-to-six months. Barcelona played the first match of 2014–15 Copa del Rey against Huesca at Estadio El Alcoraz on 3 December 2014. They won the round of 32 first leg by 0–4. Rakitić, Andrés Iniesta, Pedro and Rafinha scored the goals. Luis Enrique rested many of first team starters and handed Barça B defender Edgar Ié his debut. On 7 December, Barcelona played against Espanyol, the first Catalan Derby of 2014–15 La Liga at Camp Nou. Espanyol took the lead by a goal from Sergio García, but Barcelona eventually won the match 5–1 thanks to a hat-trick from Messi and goals from Piqué and Pedro. On 10 December, Barca played last match of the 2014–15 UEFA Champions League group stage, against Paris Saint-Germain at Camp Nou. The lead given by Zlatan Ibrahimović for PSG did not last long, as goals from Messi, Neymar and Suárez gave Barcelona the 3–1 win, ensuring the top spot in Group F. Barça played against Getafe on 13 December at Coliseum Alfonso Pérez; the match ended in a goalless draw.

On 16 December, Barca played against Huesca in the second leg of Copa del Rey at Camp Nou. Huesca was thrashed 8–1 as Pedro scored a hat-trick and Barça B winger Adama Traoré scoring his first goal of the season for the first team. Other goalscorers were Sergi Roberto, Iniesta, Adriano and Sandro. A goal from Carlos David only minimised the difference. By their 12–1 aggregate win, Barcelona are through to the last 16 of the Copa del Rey. Barça took on Córdoba at Camp Nou on 20 December, the last match of the 2014 calendar year. Barcelona ended the year with a convincing 5–0 win off goals from Pedro, Suárez, Piqué and a late double from Messi. On 30 December, Barça's appeal against two window transfer ban allotted by FIFA was rejected by CAS. As a result, Barcelona will not be allowed to sign any new player until January 2016 and have to pay a fine of approximately €375,000.

January
Barcelona's new year started on 4 January with an away match against Real Sociedad at Anoeta Stadium. A poor start for Barcelona as they lost the match 1–0. An own goal from Jordi Alba decided the result. On 5 January, Barcelona announced that they had terminated the contract of director of football Andoni Zubizarreta. He had been sacked after serving for more than four years starting from July 2010. On the same day, Carles Puyol, the assistant director of football, quit his position. On 7 January, club president Josep Maria Bartomeu called for early presidential election at the end of the 2014–15 season.

On 8 January, Barcelona played the first leg of Round of 16 of Copa del Rey against Elche at Camp Nou. Barça won the match 5–0 from a brace by Neymar and goals from Suárez, Alba and a penalty from Messi. On 11 January, Barcelona played against Atlético Madrid at Camp Nou, winning 3–1. Neymar, Suárez and Messi scored for Barça, and Mario Mandžukić reduced the gap from a penalty for Atlético. On 15 January, Barcelona played against Elche in the second leg of Round of 16 of Copa del Rey at Estadio Manuel Martínez Valero. Despite resting many first team players, Barca won 4–0 as Jérémy Mathieu, Sergi Roberto, Pedro and Adriano scored. With the win, Barça were through to the Quarter-finals of Copa del Rey with an aggregate 9–0 victory.

On 18 January, Barça took on Deportivo at Estadio Riazor, the last match of the first half of La Liga. Barca won the match 0–4 from Messi's hat-trick and an own goal by Sidnei. It was Messi's 22nd career hat-trick in La Liga. On 21 January, the first leg of quarter-finals of Copa del Rey took place between Barcelona and Atlético Madrid at Camp Nou, where Barça won 1–0 thanks to a late goal from Messi. On 24 January, Barca played against Elche at Estadio Manuel Martínez Valero. Barça won the match 0–6 as Messi and Neymar scored braces and Pedro and Piqué each scored once. Barça defeated Atlético Madrid in the second leg of the quarter-finals of Copa del Rey 2–3 goals on 28 January at the Vicente Calderón, completing a 4–2 aggregate win. Neymar scored a brace and Miranda scored an own goal for Barcelona, while Fernando Torres and Raúl García scored for Atlético.

February
On 1 February, Barcelona played the 21st match of La Liga against Villarreal at Camp Nou. Barça won the thrilling encounter 3-2 thanks to goals from Neymar, Rafinha and Messi; Denis Cheryshev and Luciano Vietto scored for Villarreal. On 8 February, Barcelona played Athletic Bilbao at the San Mamés Stadium in Bilbao. Barcelona won the match 5–2 as Messi, Luis Suárez, Neymar and Pedro scored. The other Barcelona goal was an own goal by Óscar de Marcos, while Mikel Rico and Aritz Aduriz reduced the gap for Athletic. On 11 February, Barcelona played Villarreal in the first leg of semi-finals of Copa del Rey at Camp Nou. Barça won the match 3–1 as Messi, Iniesta and Piqué scored for Barcelona, while Manu Trigueros scored for Villarreal. Neymar, meanwhile, missed a penalty.

On 15 February, Barcelona played the 23rd match of La Liga against Levante at the Camp Nou. It was Messi's 300th La Liga appearance. Barcelona won the match 5–0 as Messi scored his 23rd La Liga hat-trick, while Neymar and Suárez scored one each. On 21 February, Barça's eleven-match winning streak came to an end as they lost to Málaga, 1–0. Juanmi scored the only goal at Camp Nou. On 25 February, FC Barcelona flew to the Etihad Stadium in Manchester to play the first leg of the Champions League Round of 16 against Manchester City. Barça won the game 2–1 thanks to a brace from Suárez. Sergio Agüero reduced the gap for City in the second half of the game. On 28 February, Barcelona took on Granada at the Estadio Nuevo Los Cármenes. The Blaugranes won the match 3–1. The goals were scored by Rakitić and Suárez. Fran Rico scored for Granada, however Messi ensured Barça's victory by scoring his 27th league goal of the season.

March
On 4 March, Barcelona played the second leg of semi-finals of Copa del Rey against Villarreal at El Madrigal. Barça won the match 1–3 and went through to the final by a 6–2 aggregate scoreline. Neymar scored a brace while Suárez added one; Jonathan dos Santos scored the only goal for Villarreal. On 8 March, Barça played the 26th match of La Liga against Rayo Vallecano at Camp Nou, winning 6–1 as Messi scored his 24th La Liga hat-trick, Suárez scored a brace and Piqué scored the other. Alberto Bueno reduced the gap from a penalty while Dani Alves was sent off. With his hat-trick, Messi set the record for most hat-tricks in the history of La Liga. Additionally, Barcelona climbed to the top position of the league table with this win.

On 14 March, Barça took on Eibar at the Ipurua Municipal Stadium. Messi scored both goals as Barça won 0–2. On 18 March, Barça faced Manchester City at home for the second leg of Champions League round of 16. Barça won 1–0 on a goal by Rakitić, and as a result, Barcelona qualified for the quarter-final with a 3–1 aggregate score. Barcelona were drawn with Paris Saint-Germain in the quarter-finals draw. The second El Clásico of the Liga season was held on 22 March, during which Barcelona defeated their archrivals 2–1 at Camp Nou. The opener from Jérémy Mathieu was canceled out by Cristiano Ronaldo, but Suárez ensured a victory for Barcelona after scoring his team's second. Mathieu scored the first goal of his Barça career on the match. The win gave Barça a four-point lead over Real Madrid at the top of the table.

April
On 5 April, Barcelona played their 29th La Liga match at the Balaídos and won 0–1 against Celta Vigo, with the only goal scored by Mathieu. On 8 April, Barça took on Almería at Camp Nou, defeating the visitors 4–0, as Suárez scored a brace and Messi and Marc Bartra scored one each. On 11 April, Barcelona played against Sevilla at the Ramón Sánchez Pizjuán. The teams drew 2–2, which saw Barcelona's table lead fall to two points.

On 15 April, Barcelona flew to the Parc des Princes in Paris to play the first leg of the Champions League quarter-finals against Paris Saint-Germain. Barça won the game 1–3 via a brace from Suárez and a goal from Neymar. Mathieu reduced the gap for PSG by scoring an own goal in the second half of the game. On 18 April, Barcelona took on Valencia at home, winning 2–0 after an opening goal by Suárez and a late goal by Messi in the injury time, his 400th career goal for Barça. On 21 April, Barca took on PSG at the Camp Nou for the second leg of Champions League quarter-finals. Neymar scored both goals as Barça won 2–0, thus qualifying for the semi-finals with a 5–1 aggregate score. With victory, Barcelona reached the Champions League semi-finals for the seventh time in the last eight years.

Barcelona were drawn with Bayern Munich in the semi-finals during the semi-final draw in Nyon. On 25 April, Barcelona defeated Espanyol 0–2 at the Cornellà-El Prat and won the second derby of the season. On 28 April, Barça played its 34th match of the league season against Getafe at the Camp Nou, winning 6–0 as Messi and Suárez each scored a brace and Neymar and Xavi each got a goal.

May
On 2 May, Barcelona took on Córdoba at Estadio Nuevo Arcángel. Barcelona won the match 0–8 as Suárez scored his first Barcelona hat-trick, Messi scored twice and Neymar, Rakitić and Piqué each scored one. Messi had a chance to score a hat-trick when Córdoba conceded a penalty but he gave the chance to Neymar, who duly obliged. On 6 May, Barcelona played the first leg of the semi-finals of the Champions League against Bayern Munich, winning 3–0 as Messi scored twice in three minutes and assisted for Neymar, who scored one in injury time. Messi's second goal in the match won the UEFA Goal of the Year award.

On 9 May, Barcelona played the 2014–15 La Liga 36th matchday at Camp Nou against Real Sociedad, a game Barça won 2–0, with Neymar scoring the first with a header and Pedro scoring the second goal with a bicycle kick. With the win, Barcelona were one win away from winning the 2014–15 La Liga title as they were four points above Real Madrid with only two games left. On 12 May, Barcelona flew to the Allianz Arena in Munich to play the second leg of the semi-finals of the Champions League against Bayern Munich. Neymar scored both goals in a 2–3 Barça loss, though the team nonetheless won 5–3 on aggregate and booked their place in the final of Champions League. On 17 May, Barcelona clinched their 23rd La Liga title after winning 0–1 against Atlético Madrid at the Vicente Calderón. The game's only goal, by Messi, was enough to win the title. This was Barcelona's seventh La Liga title in the last ten years. On 21 May, Xavi had announced that he will leave Barcelona at the end of the season for Al-Sadd in Qatar.

On 23 May, Barcelona played the final match of La Liga against Deportivo at Camp Nou; Messi scored twice in the 2–2 draw. This was Xavi's last La Liga match. On 30 May, Barca took on Athletic Bilbao to play the final of the Copa del Rey at the Camp Nou. Barcelona won the match 3–1, clinching their 27th title. Messi scored twice, with the other scored by Neymar. Messi's first goal was scored through an impressive dribble on the right flank. The move started with Messi close to the half-way line. Cornered by four Bilbao players, Messi burst on and managed to beat them all with abnormal ease before running towards the goal and calmly slotting the ball past the goalkeeper. Messi's goal was subsequently nominated for the FIFA Puskás Award, an award given to the best goal of the year.

June

On 6 June, Barcelona played the 2015 UEFA Champions League Final against Juventus with the opportunity for both teams to complete the continental treble, after having already won their domestic league and cup competitions, respectively. Barcelona clinched their fifth Champions League trophy, and fourth in the last ten seasons, with a 3–1 victory over I bianconeri at the Olympiastadion in Berlin. Barcelona completed the historic treble with goals from Rakitić, Suárez and Neymar. By accomplishing this feat, Barcelona became the only European club to have won the treble twice. With the win, Barcelona qualified for the 2015 UEFA Super Cup against the 2014–15 UEFA Europa League winners Sevilla, to be played in August 2015.

Players

Squad information

From the youth squad

 Source: 
UEFA.com

Transfers in

Total spending:   €165.25 million

Transfers out

Total income:  €80.8 million

Total expenditure:   €84.45 million

Technical staff

Statistics

Squad, appearances and goals
Last updated on 6 June 2015.

|-
! colspan=12 style=background:#dcdcdc; text-align:center|Goalkeepers

|-
! colspan=12 style=background:#dcdcdc; text-align:center|Defenders

|-
! colspan=12 style=background:#dcdcdc; text-align:center|Midfielders

|-
! colspan=12 style=background:#dcdcdc; text-align:center|Forwards

|}

Pre-season and friendlies

Competitions

La Liga

League table

Results by round

Matches

Score overview

Copa del Rey

Round of 32

Round of 16

Quarter-finals

Semi-finals

Final

UEFA Champions League

Group stage

Knockout phase

Round of 16

Quarter-finals

Semi-finals

Final

2014 Supercopa de Catalunya

References

Spanish football clubs 2014–15 season
2014–15 UEFA Champions League participants seasons
2014-15
2014-15
2014–15 in Catalan football
2014-15